Nels Holman (May 3, 1861 – April 21, 1946) was an American newspaper editor, businessman, and politician.

Born to Norwegian immigrants in the town of Deerfield, Dane County, Wisconsin, Holman went to Marshall Academy and Red Wing Seminary in Red Wing, Minnesota. Holman also graduated from University of Wisconsin Law School in 1888. Holman was a lumber retail dealer and lived in North Dakota and South Dakota. In 1895, Holman became publisher and editor of the newspaper the Deerfield Enterprise and later the Deerfield Independent. Holman served as town clerk, town supervisor, and town board chairman of the town of Deerfield. Holman served on the Dane County Board of Supervisors, as chairman of the board, and on the Deerfield school board. In 1893, Holman served in the Wisconsin State Assembly and was a Republican. He served as secretary of the Dane County Drainage Commission. In 1918, Holman moved to Madison, Wisconsin. He died at his home after taking a walk.

References

External links
 

1861 births
1946 deaths
People from Deerfield, Wisconsin
University of Wisconsin Law School alumni
Businesspeople from Wisconsin
Editors of Wisconsin newspapers
Wisconsin city council members
Mayors of places in Wisconsin
School board members in Wisconsin
County supervisors in Wisconsin
Republican Party members of the Wisconsin State Assembly